Olaitan Ibrahim (born 14 February 1986) is a Nigerian Paralympic powerlifter. She won the bronze medal in the women's 67 kg event at the 2020 Summer Paralympics held in Tokyo, Japan.

At the 2019 World Para Powerlifting Championships held in Nur-Sultan, Kazakhstan, she won the silver medal in the women's 67 kg event.

Results

References

External links
 

Living people
1986 births
Female powerlifters
Paralympic powerlifters of Nigeria
Powerlifters at the 2020 Summer Paralympics
Nigerian powerlifters
Medalists at the 2020 Summer Paralympics
Paralympic bronze medalists for Nigeria
Paralympic medalists in powerlifting
People from Ondo State
21st-century Nigerian women